Purusawalkam is a defunct legislative assembly constituency, that includes the locality, Purasawalkam of Chennai City and its surroundings. Purasawalkam assembly constituency was part of Chennai Central (Lok Sabha constituency). It was later divided between Egmore and newly created Thiru-Vi-Ka Nagar assembly constituencies.

Madras State

Tamil Nadu

Election results

2006

2001

1996

1991

1989

1984

1980

1977

1971

1967

References 
 

Former assembly constituencies of Tamil Nadu
Chennai district